Pseudopaludicola saltica, also known as the Chupada swamp frog or long-legged swamp froglet , is a species of frog in the family Leptodactylidae. It is endemic to south-central Brazil (Mato Grosso, Minas Gerais, and São Paulo states, as well as the Federal District).

Pseudopaludicola saltica is a common species of Cerrado savanna. It occurs in moist fields and pastures, adapting well to anthropogenic disturbance. Breeding takes place in pools and swamps. Local populations can be threatened by habitat loss caused by intensive agriculture, fire and, dam construction.

References

saltica
Endemic fauna of Brazil
Amphibians of Brazil
Taxonomy articles created by Polbot
Amphibians described in 1887